The Blue Yonder EZ Fun Flyer is a Canadian twin-engined ultralight aircraft that was designed by Wayne Winters and is produced by Blue Yonder Aviation of Indus, Alberta. The aircraft is supplied as a kit for amateur construction.

Design and development
It features a strut-braced high-wing, inverted V-tail, a single-seat, open cockpit, conventional landing gear and twin engines in tractor configuration. The EZ Fun Flyer closely resembles the Ultraflight Lazair in configuration and dimensions.

The aircraft structure is made from aluminum tubing, with foam wing ribs. Its  span wing is supported by a single lift strut per side.

The construction time from the supplied kit is estimated by the designer at 160 hours.

Operational history
Only one example has been registered in Canada.

Specifications (EZ Fun Flyer)

References

External links

2010s Canadian ultralight aircraft
Homebuilt aircraft
High-wing aircraft
V-tail aircraft
EZ Fun Flyer
Twin piston-engined tractor aircraft